Yum! Brands, Inc. (or Yum!), formerly Tricon Global Restaurants, Inc., is an American fast food corporation listed on the Fortune 1000. Yum! operates the brands KFC, Pizza Hut, Taco Bell, and The Habit Burger Grill, except in China, where the brands are operated by a separate company, Yum China. Yum! previously also owned Long John Silver's and A&W Restaurants.

Based in Louisville, Kentucky, Yum! is one of the world's largest fast food restaurant companies in terms of system units. In 2016, Yum! had 43,617 restaurants, including 2,859 that were company-owned and 40,758 that were franchised, in 135 nations and territories worldwide.

History

PepsiCo fast food division
The company's history began in 1977, when PepsiCo entered the restaurant business by acquiring Pizza Hut. A year later, PepsiCo purchased Taco Bell. In July 1986, R. J. Reynolds sold KFC to PepsiCo to pay off debt from its recent purchase of Nabisco. In 1990, Hot 'n Now was acquired via Taco Bell, but the company was sold in 1996. In 1992, PepsiCo acquired California Pizza Kitchen. In 1993, it acquired Chevys Fresh Mex, D'Angelo Grilled Sandwiches, and the American division of Canadian chain East Side Mario's. These chains were later sold when PepsiCo exited the restaurant business and spun off KFC, Pizza Hut and Taco Bell (see next paragraph). In 1997, PepsiCo sold PepsiCo Food Systems restaurant-supply unit to Ameriserve Food Distribution Inc.

Tricon Global Restaurants

Yum! was created in 1997 as Tricon Global Restaurants, Inc. from PepsiCo's fast food division as the parent corporation of KFC, Pizza Hut and Taco Bell restaurant companies. The decision was announced in January and the spin off was effected on 6 October. Tricon selected Louisville, also the site of KFC's headquarters, as its corporate headquarters. Taco Bell and Pizza Hut continued to be headquartered in Irvine, California and Dallas, Texas, respectively.

In 2000, Tricon Global tested multi-branded locations with Yorkshire Global Restaurants. By March 2002, the Tricon-Yorkshire multibranding test consisted of 83 KFC/A&Ws, six KFC/Long John Silver's and three Taco Bell/Long John Silver's and was considered successful by the companies.

In 2001, KFC started test restaurants in Austin, Texas, called "Wing Works", a chicken wing line sold with one of a few flavored sauces. KFC also hired a consultant to develop a breakfast menu.

Yum! Brands
Yorkshire in March 2002 announced it would merge with Tricon Global Restaurants to form Yum! Brands. The merger was finalized on May 8, 2002, and the name change became effective on May 22, 2002 On June 6, 2002, Yum! executed a two-for-one stock split. Shortly afterwards, due to Yum!'s lifetime contract with Pepsi, Long John Silver's and A&W Restaurants (which previously served Coca-Cola products) began switching to Pepsi products, with A&W Restaurants retaining A&W Root Beer from a separate deal with Dr Pepper/Seven Up (now Keurig Dr Pepper).

In 2002, Yum! began testing co-branding locations pairing Pizza Hut with Pasta Bravo, Back Yard Burgers, and A&W. The Pasta Bravo concept was acquired in 2003 from Pasta Bravo, Inc. of Aliso Viejo, California for $5 million to pair with Pizza Hut.

In 2003, Yum! launched WingStreet as a hybrid combo unit with an existing Pizza Hut franchise. In 2007 and 2008, a thousand WingStreet stores a year were opened. On October 19, 2009, Company president Scott Bergren publicized WingStreet's national launch.

An East Dawning test cafeteria-style restaurant was opened in Shanghai in 2004. After initially failing, Yum! Brands chose the KFC business model (KFC is the most successful Western chain in China) and found greater success. As of September 30, 2007, eight East Dawning restaurants were in operation.

International focus

In January 2011, Yum! announced its intentions to divest itself of its Long John Silver's and A&W brands to focus on its core brands of KFC, Pizza Hut and Taco Bell. For the decade leading up to the company's announcement, major growth had relied on international expansion. With little presence outside North America, the two chains no longer fit in the company's long-term growth plans. The foreign expansion—particularly that of Taco Bell, KFC and Pizza Hut—was cited in the firm's January 18, 2011 announcement of its intention to sell the A&W and Long John Silver's chains. Both of those chains also suffered from poor sales, and had fewer locations compared to the other chains in the Yum! Brands portfolio. In September 2011, Yum! announced they had found buyers for the A&W and Long John Silver's chains. A Great American Brand will buy A&W, and Long John Silver's will be acquired by LJS Partners LLC.

In May 2011, Yum! agreed to purchase Chinese hot pot chain Little Sheep for HK$4.56 billion. The deal spent more than 4 months in antitrust review by the Chinese Ministry of Commerce, to determine whether or not the transaction would result in a monopolistic positioning of Yum! in the country's restaurant industry. The Ministry approved the deal in November 2011, according to Little Sheep representatives.

In 2012, a KFC opened in Ramallah and became the first American fast food restaurant to operate in the West Bank; a Pizza Hut is also planned.

In 2013, a few KFC locations in China supplied chicken found to contain "excess levels of chemical residue". Yum! had lost 6% of sales from publicity in China as of January 25, 2013.

The company opened its first restaurant in Ulaanbaatar, Mongolia, in May 2013. For Mongolia, KFC is the first western fast food to open its doors in the country. The company is planning to open 15 more restaurants in Ulaanbaatar in the next 5 years, including the country's first drive-thru service. Yum! Brands has also opened Taco Bell and Pizza Hut restaurants in newer Target stores.

Yum! Brands opened its 40,000th store in Calangute, Goa, India in October 2013.

In 2013, its KFC subsidiary opened a fast casual version, KFC eleven, test location in Louisville on Bardstown Road. The sole KFC Eleven was closed in April 2015. In the third quarter of 2013, Yum! Brands had to book an impairment of the goodwill resulting from the takeover of Little Sheep in 2011 in the amount of $222 million, which reduced profits for 2013.

In 2014, Yum! launched a number of additional restaurant test concepts, Super Chix, U.S. Taco Co. and Banh Shop. Yum! opened Super Chix in Central Arlington, Texas, a restaurant similar in format to Chick-fil-A, on April 9, 2014. In the summer of 2014, Yum!'s Taco Bell subsidiary launched its U.S. Taco Co and Urban Tap Room fast-casual taco concept restaurant in Huntington Beach, California, to take on fast casual restaurants like Chipotle and Panera.

In the first quarter of 2015, Third Point Management and Corvex Management separately acquired an unspecified stake in the company. A second Chix unit opened in May 2015 with additional menu items. Super Chix was sold to founder Nick Ouimet and an investment group in August 2015.

In 2017, Yum! announced plans to open 10 Pizza Hut restaurants in Ethiopia, after signing a franchise with the country's Belayab Foods and Franchise PLC.

In January 2020, Yum! announced they were acquiring Irvine, California-based The Habit Burger Grill, for $375 million; the transaction has completed on March 18, 2020.

In 2020 and 2021, Yum! acquired several technology companies. In March 2020, it acquired Heartstyles, an omnichannel training company. In March 2021, it acquired Tictuk Technologies, an Israeli omnichannel ordering and marketing solutions provider, and announced it was acquiring Kvantum Inc., an artificial intelligence-based consumer insights and marketing technology company. In September 2021, Yum! completed the acquisition of Australian kitchen order management and delivery technology company Dragontail Systems for US$69.1 million in cash.

Corporate

The current CEO of Yum! Brands is David Gibbs. Former CEOs include Greg Creed and David C. Novak. Novak became CEO of predecessor firm Tricon Global on January 1, 2000, and chairman of the board on January 1, 2001. Greg Creed replaced Novak in his role as CEO on January 1, 2015. At the AGM in May 2016, Robert D. Walter became non-executive chairman. At the end of 2019 Greg Creed will retire as CEO and the current COO (David Gibbs) will be Creed's replacement.

Since 2006, Yum! Brands has served as the corporate sponsor of the Kentucky Derby.

On October 20, 2015, Yum! Brands, Inc., announced that it intended to separate into two independent, publicly traded companies. Yum China was spun off on November 1, 2016.

Brands

Current
 KFC
 Pizza Hut
 Taco Bell
 Banh Shop (minority investor)
 The Habit Burger Grill

Former
 A&W Restaurants – Sold to A Great American Brand LLC, a consortium of A&W franchisees, in 2011
 D'Angelo Grilled Sandwiches – Sold to Papa Gino's in 1997
 Hot 'n Now – Acquired by PepsiCo in 1990, placed under the Taco Bell branch. Now mostly defunct, with only 1 out of 150 remaining in Sturgis, Michigan, now owned by BTND, LLC the owner of Burger Time
 Long John Silver's – Sold to LJS Partners, Long John Silver's franchisees and other private investors, in 2011
 Pasta Bravo
 Super Chix
 East Dawning – Spun off into Yum! China in 2016
 Little Sheep – Spun off into Yum! China in 2016

See also

 List of major employers in Louisville, Kentucky
Yum China
 Restaurant Brands

References

External links
 

 
Companies listed on the New York Stock Exchange
Companies based in Louisville, Kentucky
Restaurants established in 1997
Multinational food companies
Restaurant groups in the United States
1997 establishments in Kentucky
American companies established in 1997
Corporate spin-offs